Moon Dogs is a collection of science fiction short stories and essays by Michael Swanwick. It was published by NESFA Press in 2000 to commemorate his appearance as Guest of Honor at Boskone 37. It includes collaborations with Gardner Dozois and Jack Dann.

2000 short story collections
Short story collections by Michael Swanwick
NESFA Press books